Lobelia inflata, also known as Indian tobacco or puke weed, is a species of Lobelia native to eastern North America, from southeastern Canada (Nova Scotia to southeast Ontario) south through the eastern United States to Alabama and west to Kansas.

Description

They are alternately arranged. It has violet flowers that are tinted yellow on the inside, and usually appear in mid-summer and continue to bloom into fall. The seedcases are small, brown, dehiscent, and papery.

Propagation
Propagation is usually accomplished by cuttings or seed. Seeds are sown in containers in mid spring or mid fall. The seeds take about 2 weeks to germinate.

Traditional uses and adverse effects
Lobelia inflata has a long use as a medicinal plant as an entheogenic, emetic, and skin or respiratory aid. Native Americans used it for respiratory and muscle disorders, as a purgative, and as a ceremonial medicine. The leaves were chewed and smoked. The plant was used as a traditional medicinal plant by the Cherokee, Iroquois, Penobscot, and other indigenous peoples. The foliage was burned by the Cherokee as a natural insecticide, to smoke out gnats.

Although it may be used medicinally, consuming lobelia causes adverse effects, which may include sweating, nausea, vomiting, diarrhea, tremors, rapid heartbeat, mental confusion, convulsions, hypothermia, coma, or possibly death. The root is toxic and can be fatal if eaten.

Chemical constituents
Lobelia inflata contains multiple alkaloid compounds, including lobeline, norlobelanine, lobelanidine, and radicamine, among other compounds, such as flavonoids, terpenes, alkynes, and coumarins. Lobeline concentration is highest in the seeds.

References

External links
 USDA Plants Profile for Lobelia inflata (Indian-tobacco)
 Lobelia inflata - Plants For A Future database report
 Indian Tobacco (Lobelia inflata)

inflata
Flora of Eastern Canada
Flora of the Northeastern United States
Flora of the North-Central United States
Flora of the Southeastern United States
Flora of the Appalachian Mountains
Flora of the Great Lakes region (North America)
Entheogens
Plants used in traditional Native American medicine
Plants described in 1753
Taxa named by Carl Linnaeus
Flora without expected TNC conservation status